Petronila is a city in Nueces County, Texas, United States. The population of the city was 89 at the 2020 census.

Geography

Petronila is located at  (27.674613, –97.636360).

Demographics

As of the 2020 United States census, there were 89 people, 37 households, and 20 families residing in the city.

As of the census of 2000, there were 83 people, 30 households, and 24 families residing in the city. The population density was 46.3 people per square mile (17.9/km). There were 40 housing units at an average density of 22.3/sq mi (8.6/km). The racial makeup of the city was 73.49% White, 1.20% African American, 1.20% Native American, 21.69% from other races, and 2.41% from two or more races. Hispanic or Latino of any race were 33.73% of the population.

There were 30 households, out of which 46.7% had children under the age of 18 living with them, 63.3% were married couples living together, 6.7% had a female householder with no husband present, and 20.0% were non-families. 13.3% of all households were made up of individuals, and 6.7% had someone living alone who was 65 years of age or older. The average household size was 2.77 and the average family size was 3.00.

In the city, the population was spread out, with 27.7% under the age of 18, 6.0% from 18 to 24, 28.9% from 25 to 44, 26.5% from 45 to 64, and 10.8% who were 65 years of age or older. The median age was 36 years. For every 100 females, there were 102.4 males. For every 100 females age 18 and over, there were 106.9 males.

The median income for a household in the city was $51,250, and the median income for a family was $60,417. Males had a median income of $21,250 versus $23,750 for females. The per capita income for the city was $24,181. There were 3.7% of families and 5.3% of the population living below the poverty line, including 9.1% of under eighteens and 6.7% of those over 64.

Education
The City of Petronila is served by the Bishop Consolidated Independent School District.

References

Cities in Nueces County, Texas
Cities in Texas
Corpus Christi metropolitan area